Very little is known about Jayavarman II's son and successor, Jayavarman III, or Vishnuloka, the second ruler of Angkor.
The future Khmer king, Yasovarman I, claimed to be related to the brother of Jayavarman III's grandmother, Rudravarman.
An inscription from Prasat Sak describes: "When he failed to capture a wild elephant while hunting, a divinity promised that he would secure the animal if he built a sanctuary." There are some temples dated to his reign though none said that they belonged to him. He may have begun a small construction project which was overshadowed by his more ambitious successor and builder, Indravarman I. He died in 877 probably from chasing a wild elephant.

Notes

References
Briggs, Lawrence Palmer. The Ancient Khmer Empire. Transactions of the American Philosophical Society, 1951.
Higham, Charles. The Civilization of Angkor.  University of California Press, 2001.

9th-century Cambodian monarchs
Hindu monarchs
Khmer Empire
877 deaths